Nuraly Paktuly Alip (Nūraly Paqtūly Älıp; born 22 December 1999) is a Kazakh professional footballer who plays as a centre-back for Russian Premier League club Zenit St. Petersburg and the Kazakhstan national football team.

Career
In January 2022, Alip joined up with Zenit Saint Petersburg for a trial during their week long training camp in the United Arab Emirates. On 16 February 2022, Alip joined Zenit on loan until the end of 2022, with an option to buy. On 14 December 2022, Alip moved to Zenit on a permanent basis and signed a contract until the end of the 2024–25 season, with an option to extend for a year.

Career statistics

Club

International

Honours
Kairat
 Kazakhstan Premier League: 2020
 Kazakhstan Cup: 2018
 Kazakhstan Super Cup runner-up: 2018, 2019

Zenit Saint Petersburg
 Russian Premier League: 2021–22
 Russian Super Cup: 2022

References

External links
UEFA U19 Profile

1999 births
People from Aktau
Living people
Kazakhstani footballers
Association football midfielders
Kazakhstan youth international footballers
Kazakhstan under-21 international footballers
Kazakhstan international footballers
Kazakhstan Premier League players
FC Kairat players
FC Zenit Saint Petersburg players
Russian Premier League players
Kazakhstani expatriate footballers
Expatriate footballers in Russia
Kazakhstani expatriate sportspeople in Russia